Pasir Mas District is a district (jajahan) in Kelantan, Malaysia. The district  covers an area of 614.15 square kilometers and is bordered by the districts of Tumpat District to the north, Tanah Merah District to the south, Kota Bharu District to the east, and the Thai district of Su-ngai Kolok to the west.

Due to its geographical location, it acts as the main gateway of the East Coast of Malaysia to Thailand and is also traversed by major road transport routes from the West Coast to the state capital of Kota Bharu.

The district of Pasir Mas was originally part of the district of Kota Bharu. In 1918, the town of Pasir Mas and its surrounding areas were separated from Kota Bharu and granted its own local government. The seat of this district is the town of Pasir Mas.

Transportation

Rail
A railway station operated by Keretapi Tanah Melayu (KTM) is located here. The station is part of KTM Intercity's Rantau Panjang Line and interchanges with the East Coast Line which ends at the Tumpat railway station.

The nightly Ekspres Timuran from Johor Bahru usually reaches here at around 9:00 am. Ekspres Wau departs at 6:30 pm for the 13-hour journey to KL Sentral, Kuala Lumpur. The Rantau Panjang Line continues towards north at Rantau Panjang railway station at the border town of Rantau Panjang and links to the Southern Line of the State Railway of Thailand.

A new railway station which replaced the original one at the same location was completed in July 2008. The reasonable fare attracts small-traders, who would board here with various goods - usually foodstuff from Rantau Panjang - to transport to the interiors. The trains' scheduled arrivals and departures often create traffic jams in the town several times daily. A carriageway connecting Lemal and Kubang Panjang over the railway track has been built to overcome this. Trains no longer stop at the hamlet station of Tok Uban along the way to Tanah Merah.

Bus
From Pasir Mas town, it is possible to go to any state capital in Peninsular Malaysia without having to change buses. However, buses departing from these state capitals with Kota Bharu as the final destination might not pass through Pasir Mas. But those with Rantau Panjang as the final destination, will.

The most popular inter-state bus company is Transnasional, which is majority-owned by a federal government agency. Syarikat Kenderaan Melayu Kelantan (SKMK) has a monopoly of inter-district and intra-district bus routes. There are direct buses to the main towns of Kota Bharu, Rantau Panjang and Tanah Merah and vice versa; which depart every 30 minutes from 7:00 am to 6:30 pm. The bus station is at the centre of the town; about 100 metres from the train station.

Population

Pasir Mas as of 2010 Census, it has a population of 189,292 people.

Ranking Population of Jajahan Pasir Mas.

Federal Parliament and State Assembly Seats 

List of LMS district representatives in the Federal Parliament (Dewan Rakyat)

List of LMS district representatives in the State Legislative Assembly of Kelantan

Education
Several types of schools can be found in Pasir Mas. Among the schools in Pasir Mas are
Sekolah Menengah Kebangsaan Baroh Pial, Kampung Bukit Tandak, 17200 Rantau Panjang 
Sekolah Menengah Kebangsaan Bunut Susu, Kampung Bunut Susu, 17020 Pasir Mas 
Sekolah Menengah Kebangsaan Chetok, Kampung Sungai Keladi, 17060 Pasir Mas 
Sekolah Menengah Kebangsaan Gual Periok, Gual Periok, 17200 Rantau Panjang
Sekolah Menengah Kebangsaan Kangkong, Wakil Pos Kangkong, 17040 Pasir Mas
Sekolah Menengah Kebangsaan Kedondong, Kampung Kedondong, 17010 Pasir Mas 
Sekolah Menengah Kebangsaan Meranti, Kampung Meranti, 17010 Pasir Mas 
Sekolah Menengah Kebangsaan Pasir Mas, Jalan Masjid, 17000 Pasir Mas 
Sekolah Menengah Kebangsaan Rantau Panjang, Pekan Rantau Panjang, 17200 Rantau Panjang
Sekolah Menengah Kebangsaan Sultan Ibrahim (1), Jalan Meranti, 17000 Pasir Mas
 
Sekolah Menengah Kebangsaan Sultan Ibrahim (2), Jalan Hospital, 17000 Pasir Mas
Sekolah Menengah Kebangsaan Tendong, Tendong, 17030 Pasir Mas 
Sekolah Menengah Kebangsaan Tiang Chandi, Repek, 17070 Pasir Mas
Sekolah Menengah Kebangsaan Tengku Panglima Raja, Km 5, Jalan Pasir Mas - Tanah Merah, Lemal, 17000 Pasir Mas  
Sekolah Menengah Kebangsaan To' Uban, To' Uban, 17050 Pasir Mas
Sekolah Menengah Kebangsaan Teknik Pasir Mas, Jalan Tendong - Bunut Susu, 17020 Pasir Mas

Sekolah Menengah Kebangsaan Kampung Dangar, Jalan Kubang Badak, 17000 Pasir Mas 

Sekolah Menengah Kebangsaan Kubang Bemban, Km 2, Jalan Pasir Mas - Meranti, 17000 Pasir Mas

References

External links